Henri Ory (28 April 1884 – 4 August 1963) was a French racing cyclist. He rode in the 1920 Tour de France.

References

1884 births
1963 deaths
French male cyclists
Place of birth missing